Parcelair is a cargo airline based in Palmerston North, New Zealand. It operates scheduled overnight cargo services on behalf of owners Fieldair Holdings and Airwork Flight Operations. Domestic charter services are also operated.

History 
The airline started operations on the 25th of June, 2015. Its primary contract is with the courier division of the Freightways Group and New Zealand Post. It is a wholly owned company by a 50/50 Joint Venture. The Boeing 737 has a payload of 17 tonnes it carries 11 cargons of freight on each trip. Due to the rapid growth of online shopping there was a need to replace the smaller ageing Convair CV580s operated by Air Freight NZ with the larger Boeing 737s.

Destinations 
Parcelair operates freight services between Auckland, Christchurch and Palmerston North.

Fleet 
 3 Boeing 737-400F

References

External links

Airlines of New Zealand
Airlines established in 2015
Cargo airlines of New Zealand
New Zealand companies established in 2015